Al Sormeh (also known as ‘Alī Sūrmeh) is a village in Zeri Rural District, Qatur District, Khoy County, West Azerbaijan Province, Iran. At the 2006 census, its population was 730, in 114 families.

References 

Populated places in Khoy County